St. Joseph is a city in Stearns County, Minnesota, United States. The population was 6,534 at the 2010 census and according to 2019 census estimates is now 7,351. It is home to the College of Saint Benedict.

St. Joseph is part of the St. Cloud Metropolitan Statistical Area.

History
Originally home to the native Ojibwe, Winnebago, Sioux, and Dakota people, St. Joseph was laid out in 1855, and named after a local church. St. Joseph was incorporated in 1890. The unincorporated Florida community of St. Joseph, Florida, was named after the Minnesota city.  St. Joseph contains three properties listed on the National Register of Historic Places: the 1869 Church of St. Joseph, the 1918 First State Bank building, and a district of historic buildings at the Saint Benedict's Monastery and College built from 1882 to the 1920s.

Geography

Stearns County Road 75 serves as a main route in the community.  Other routes include County Roads 2, 3, 121, 133, and 134.  Interstate 94/US Highway 52 is nearby.

Some of the city's major landmarks include St. Joseph Catholic Church, St. Benedict's Monastery, and the College of St. Benedict. The College of Saint Benedict is an all-women's Catholic college, and the complex is noted in the downtown area for the high spire of St. Joseph's Church, and the rotunda and dome of the Monastery and College Sacred Heart Chapel. The architecture is different from other buildings and the major structures are visible from miles away.

Demographics

2020 census

Note: the US Census treats Hispanic/Latino as an ethnic category. This table excludes Latinos from the racial categories and assigns them to a separate category. Hispanics/Latinos can be of any race.

2014 census estimates
The population in 2014 was 6,820 people with 99% being urban and 1% rural. St. Joseph is sometimes reported as the American town with the highest female population percentage (over two-thirds), when the figures include the College of St. Benedict. The racial makeup of the city was 93.1% white, 1.9% Asian, 1.5% African American, 1.2% Hispanic, 0.3% American Indian, and 1.4% multi-racial. The median age of residents was 21.8 years old. In 2015, the estimated median household income was $50,077 while the estimated per capita income was $21,236. The median house or condo value was estimated to be $165,928.

2010 census
As of the census of 2010, there were 6,534 people, 1,845 households, and 1,184 families living in the city. The racial makeup of the city was 93.7% White, 1.1% African American, 0.2% Native American, 2.4% Asian, 0.9% from other races, and 1.7% from two or more races. Hispanic or Latino of any race were 1.9% of the population.

There were 1,845 households, of which 33.3% had children under the age of 18 living with them, 50.7% were married couples living together, 9.5% had a female householder with no husband present, 4.0% had a male householder with no wife present, and 35.8% were non-families. 21.2% of all households were made up of individuals, and 5.3% had someone living alone who was 65 years of age or older. The average household size was 2.61 and the average family size was 2.96.

The median age in the city was 22.7 years. 17.1% of residents were under the age of 18; 37.7% were between the ages of 18 and 24; 22.3% were from 25 to 44; 15.1% were from 45 to 64; and 7.9% were 65 years of age or older. The gender makeup of the city was 37.2% male and 62.8% female.

2000 census
As of the census of 2000, there were 4,681 people, 1,120 households, and 712 families living in the city. The racial makeup of the city was 96.69% White, 1.00% African American, 0.21% Native American, 0.98% Asian, 0.06% Pacific Islander, 0.38% from other races, and 0.66% from two or more races. Hispanics or Latinos of any race were 1.22% of the population.

There were 1,120 households, out of which 35.5% had children under the age of 18 living with them, 48.2% were married couples living together, 10.9% had a female householder with no husband present, and 36.4% were non-families. 21.3% of all households were made up of individuals, and 6.1% had someone living alone who was 65 years of age or older.  The average household size was 2.74 and the average family size was 3.06.

The age distribution is 16.7% under the age of 18, 44.4% from 18 to 24, 19.8% from 25 to 44, 10.4% from 45 to 64, and 8.6% who were 65 years of age or older. The median age was 22 years. For every 100 females, there were 46.4 males.  For every 100 females age 18 and over, there were 39.1 males.

The median income for a household in the city was $38,938, and the median income for a family was $44,737. Males had a median income of $33,344 versus $22,007 for females. The per capita income for the city was $12,011.  About 5.4% of families and 20.8% of the population were below the poverty line, including 7.7% of those under age 18 and 35.2% of those age 65 or over.

Education

Primary and secondary education 
St. Joseph is served by the St. Cloud Area School District, The majority of St. Joseph is zoned to Kennedy Community School (PK-8). while some portions in the east are zoned to Westwood Elementary School and North Middle School. The zoned high school is Apollo High School.

Kennedy Community School is a PreK-8 grade school, serving families from St. Joseph. The school opened in the Fall of 2008 following a successful referendum to build a larger school about a mile outside of town. The prior school, Kennedy Elementary, was established in 1968.

Saint Joseph Catholic School is a parochial school located in St. Joseph and has been associated with the local parish of the same name since the 1850s. At that time there was no money to pay a teacher, so parents did work for a local farmer, who in turn, taught the children. The school got its own building in the 1920s. For many years, it served as the only school in town and as the community center.  The school later collaborated with the College of St. Benedict to become a lab school in the 1970s. In the 2000s, it joined with St. Cloud area parochial schools to become part of All Saints Academy.

Higher education 
The College of Saint Benedict (CSB) is a four-year, private liberal arts college and the nation's only Benedictine college for women. The college opened in 1913, with six students enrolled, and grew out of St. Benedict's Academy, which was founded by Saint Benedict's Monastery in 1889. The Benedictine community incorporated CSB in 1961. The college is also connected to Saint John's University (SJU), which is a male-only university in Collegeville Township, Minnesota.

Events
In May of each year since 2008, hundreds of runners line up in Holdingford, Minnesota and run the 26.2 mile Lake Wobegon Trail Marathon route to the finish line in St. Joseph.

The College of St. Benedict is home to the Claire Lynch Gym, where the NCAA DIII Bennies complete in volleyball and basketball against regional MIAC teams. The outdoor athletic complex is the Bennies home for hosting MIAC soccer and softball games.

Since 2006, the Church of St. Joseph has hosted the annual Joetown Rocks music concert, which in recent years has seen annual turnouts of several thousand people. The outdoor concert traditionally occurs in conjunction with Independence Day, and has featured headlining acts such as the Killer Vees, stars from the original Broadway cast of Jersey Boys, and the Fabulous Armadillos.

Notable people
 Steve Dehler (born 1950), was a Minnesota legislator and mayor of St. Joseph.
 Joyce Sutphen (born 1949) was named in 2011 as the State's Poet Laureate by Minnesota Governor Mark Dayton.
 Jacob Wetterling (born February 17, 1978) was kidnapped from his hometown at the age of 11 on October 22, 1989. It was announced on September 3, 2016 that Jacob's remains had been found and positively identified.
 Patty Wetterling (born November 2, 1949) is an advocate for children's safety, particularly focused on protecting children from abduction and abuse. Her advocacy began after her son, Jacob, was abducted in 1989.
 The Servant of God Sister Annella Zervas, O.S.B. (1900–1926), is the closest that Minnesota possesses to a Canonized Saint. Her grave in the cemetery of Saint Benedict's Monastery continues to receive pilgrims.

See also
 Saint Joseph

References

External links
 St. Joseph City Website

Cities in Stearns County, Minnesota
Cities in Minnesota
St. Cloud, Minnesota metropolitan area
Populated places established in 1854
German-American culture in Minnesota
1854 establishments in Minnesota Territory